John Parco (born August 25, 1971) is an Italian-Canadian former professional ice hockey player who played most of his professional career with Asiago HC in the Serie A. He is formerly the head coach of the Soo Thunderbirds in the Northern Ontario Junior Hockey League and was formerly the head coach of Asiago HC and SG Cortina in Serie A. Internationally he represented Italy from 2003 until 2010 highlighted by scoring 3 goals in the Turin Olympics.

Playing career
John Parco, born John Porco, played three seasons of junior hockey for the Belleville Bulls of the Ontario Hockey League (OHL) from 1988 until 1991. He was drafted 248th overall by the Philadelphia Flyers in the 1991 NHL Entry Draft but never played in the NHL.  Instead Parco joined Asiago HC in Italy for two seasons.  In 1993, Parco moved back to North America and split the season with the IHL's San Diego Gulls, the ECHL's Hampton Roads Admirals and the AHL's Saint John Flames.  He moved back to Asiago the next season before moving to the Deutsche Eishockey Liga in Germany, spending two seasons with the Kaufbeurer Adler.  He then had a two-year spell with the Ayr Scottish Eagles in the United Kingdom.  He returned to Hampton Roads in 1999 for one season before moving back to Britain with the Cardiff Devils.  In 2001, he returned to Asiago where he remained as a player until 2010 and then started working as an assistant coach.  In 2004, he was player-coach of the team but had little success and was replaced mid-season while remaining as a player. He became head coach of Asiago again in 2012.

Career statistics

Regular season and playoffs

International

References

External links

1971 births
Ayr Scottish Eagles players
Belleville Bulls players
Canadian ice hockey centres
Canadian people of Italian descent
Cardiff Devils players
Citizens of Italy through descent
Asiago Hockey 1935 players
Hampton Roads Admirals players
Ice hockey people from Ontario
Ice hockey players at the 2006 Winter Olympics
Italian people of Canadian descent
Kaufbeurer Adler players
Living people
Olympic ice hockey players of Italy
Sportspeople from Sault Ste. Marie, Ontario
Philadelphia Flyers draft picks
Saint John Flames players
San Diego Gulls (IHL) players
Canadian expatriate ice hockey players in England
Canadian expatriate ice hockey players in Scotland
Canadian expatriate ice hockey players in Wales
Italian expatriate sportspeople in Germany
Canadian expatriate ice hockey players in Germany
Italian expatriate ice hockey people
Italian expatriate sportspeople in Scotland
Italian expatriate sportspeople in Wales
Canadian expatriate ice hockey players in the United States
Italian expatriate sportspeople in the United States